Sultan Al-Shamsi (Arabic:سلطان الشامسي) (born 22 June 1996) is an Emirati footballer who plays as a left winger for Al Ain.

International career
Al-Shamsi made his senior debut for United Arab Emirates on 3 June 2016, where he scored the equalising goal in a 1–3 defeat to Jordan.

International goal
As of match played 3 June 2016. United Arab Emirates score listed first, score column indicates score after each Al-Shamsi goal.

References

External links
 

Emirati footballers
United Arab Emirates international footballers
Al Jazira Club players
Association football wingers
1996 births
Living people
Al Dhafra FC players
Baniyas Club players
Al Ain FC players
UAE Pro League players